Marc Chin (born 8 September 1987) is a Caymanian cricketer.  Chin is a right-handed batsman who bowls right-arm off break.

Chin made a single first-class appearance for the Cayman Islands against Canada at the Toronto Cricket, Skating and Curling Club in the 2005 Intercontinental Cup.  He was dismissed for a duck in the Cayman Islands first-innings by Henry Osinde.  In Canada's first-innings, he took the wickets of Ashish Bagai and Nicholas Ifill, finishing with figures of 2/104 from twenty overs.  In the Cayman Islands second-innings he was dismissed for 14 runs by Kevin Sandher.  In Canada's second-innings, he took the wicket of Bagai once more, finishing with figures of 1/36 from ten overs.  Canada won the match by 120 runs.

References

External links
Marc Chin at ESPNcricinfo
Marc Chin at CricketArchive

1987 births
Living people
Caymanian cricketers